{{DISPLAYTITLE:C2H4O2}}
C2H4O2 may refer to:

Compounds sharing the molecular formula:
 Acetic acid
 Dihydroxyethene isomers:
1,1-Dihydroxyethene
 (E)-1,2-Dihydroxyethene
 (Z)-1,2-Dihydroxyethene
 Dioxetane isomers:
1,2-Dioxetane
 1,3-Dioxetane
 Glycolaldehyde
 Methyldioxirane
 Methyl formate
 Oxiranol